2001 Maniacs is a 2005 American comedy horror film directed by Tim Sullivan and starring Robert Englund, Lin Shaye, Jay Gillespie, Dylan Edrington, and Matthew Carey. It is a remake of the 1964 film Two Thousand Maniacs! written and directed by Herschell Gordon Lewis. The film is distributed by Lions Gate Entertainment. It was filmed in Westville, Georgia.

Plot

Six prep college students and a biker couple travel south towards Daytona Beach for Spring Break, but a detour leads them into the seemingly idyllic Georgia town of Pleasant Valley, which is holding its annual "Guts and Glory Jubilee" in honor of the American Civil War.

While they stay in the town, completely isolated from the outside world, they are systematically separated and killed in gory fashion by the town's residents. Two students manage to escape, but upon alerting the authorities they learn that "Pleasant Valley" is nothing but a cemetery - a memorial for 2001 Confederate villagers who were massacred 140 years earlier by renegade Union troops during the Civil War. A plaque reveals that the town's residents will not rest until the crime has been paid back: 2001 villagers were killed, 2001 Northerners must be killed - an eye for an eye.

As the two students drive away on their motorcycle, they are decapitated by barbed wire. The heads are picked up by Hucklebilly who walks down the road and fades away.

Cast

Production
Filming took place on November 3, 2003 in Westville, Georgia and ended on December 1, 2003. Eli Roth, who produced the film, reprised his role of Justin from his own film, Cabin Fever.

Release
The film was released May 12, 2005. The film was released on DVD in 2007.

Sequel
On the official Facebook page for the film, the sequel 2001 Maniacs: The Beverly Hellbillys was announced (later renamed to 2001 Maniacs: Field of Screams). Mayor Buckman and Harper Alexander are now portrayed by Bill Moseley and Nivek Ogre respectively.

See also
List of ghost films

References

External links
 
 
 
 2001 Maniacs at FEARnet

2005 films
2005 horror films
2005 LGBT-related films
American comedy horror films
Remakes of American films
American LGBT-related films
American splatter films
Films about race and ethnicity
Films produced by Eli Roth
Films scored by Nathan Barr
Films set in Georgia (U.S. state)
Horror film remakes
LGBT-related horror films
2005 directorial debut films
2000s English-language films
Films directed by Tim Sullivan
2000s American films